Scott Thomas Peters (born November 23, 1978) is an American football coach and former offensive lineman who is the assistant offensive line coach for the Cleveland Browns of the National Football League (NFL). He was drafted by the Philadelphia Eagles in the fourth round of the 2002 NFL Draft. He played college football at Arizona State, and high school football at Amador Valley High School. Peters was also a member of the Arizona Cardinals, Carolina Panthers, San Francisco 49ers and New York Giants.

Playing career
Peters was drafted in 2002 by the Philadelphia Eagles (124th overall). He played for seven seasons in the NFL, and was accredited with six seasons, as an offensive guard and center before retiring from football in 2009.

Coaching career

Cleveland Browns
On February 13, 2020, Peters was hired by the Cleveland Browns as their assistant offensive line coach under head coach Kevin Stefanski. Peters has been open about using Brazilian jiu-jitsu in order to help train the team.

Peters missed the team's wild card playoff game against the Pittsburgh Steelers on January 10, 2021, due to COVID-19 protocols, but returned for the next playoff game.

References

1978 births
Living people
People from the San Gabriel Valley
American football centers
Arizona State Sun Devils football players
Philadelphia Eagles players
New York Giants players
San Francisco 49ers players
Sportspeople from Los Angeles County, California
Carolina Panthers players
People from Arcadia, California
Players of American football from California
People from Pleasanton, California